Peter Stephen Paul Brook  (21 March 1925 – 2 July 2022) was an English theatre and film director. He worked first in England, from 1945 at the Birmingham Repertory Theatre, from 1947 at the Royal Opera House, and from 1962 for the Royal Shakespeare Company (RSC). With them, he directed the first English-language production in 1964 of Marat/Sade by Peter Weiss, which was transferred to Broadway in 1965 and won the Tony Award for Best Play, and Brook was named Best Director. He also directed films such as an iconic version of Lord of the Flies in 1963.

He was based in France from the early 1970s, where he founded an international theatre company, playing in developing countries, in an approach of great simplicity. He was often referred to as "our greatest living theatre director". He won multiple Emmy Awards, a Laurence Olivier Award, the Japanese Praemium Imperiale, the Prix Italia and the Europe Theatre Prize. In 2021, he was awarded India's Padma Shri.

Early life
Brook was born on 21 March 1925 in the Bedford Park area of Chiswick, the second son of Simon Brook and his wife Ida (Judelson), both Lithuanian Jewish immigrants from Latvia. The family home was at 27 Fairfax Road, Turnham Green. His elder brother Alexis became a psychiatrist and psychotherapist. His first cousin was Valentin Pluchek, chief director of the Moscow Satire Theatre. Brook was educated at Westminster School, Gresham's School, and Magdalen College, Oxford, where he studied languages until 1945. Brook was excused from military service during World War II due to childhood illness.

Career

England 
Brook directed Marlowe's Dr Faustus, his first production, in 1943 at the Torch Theatre in London, followed at the Chanticleer Theatre in 1945 with a revival of Cocteau's The Infernal Machine. He was engaged from 1945 as stage director at the Birmingham Repertory Theatre (BRT). Hired by BRT direct Barry Jackson when he was just twenty years old, Jackson described Brook as "the youngest earthquake I've known".

In 1947, Brook went to Stratford-upon-Avon as assistant director on Romeo and Juliet and Love's Labour's Lost for the Shakespeare Memorial Theatre. From 1947 to 1950, he was Director of Productions at the Royal Opera House in London. His work there included an effective re-staging of Puccini's La bohème using sets dating from 1899, in 1948, and a highly controversial staging of Salome by Richard Strauss with sets by Salvador Dalí in 1949. A proliferation of stage and screen work as producer and director followed. Howard Richardson's Dark of the Moon at the Ambassadors Theatre, London, in 1949 was an early, much admired production. From 1962, he was director of the Royal Shakespeare Company (RSC), together with Peter Hall. With them, he directed the first English-language production in 1964 of Marat/Sade by the German playwright Peter Weiss. It transferred to Broadway in 1965 and won the Tony Award for Best Play, and Brook was named Best Director. In 1966, they presented US, an anti-Vietnam War protest play.

Influences
Brook was influenced by the work of Antonin Artaud and his ideas for his Theatre of Cruelty.

In England, Peter Brook and Charles Marowitz undertook The Theatre of Cruelty Season (1964) at the Royal Shakespeare Company, aiming to explore ways in which Artaud's ideas could be used to find new forms of expression and retrain the performer. The result was a showing of 'works in progress' made up of improvisations and sketches, one of which was the premier of Artaud's The Spurt of Blood.
– Lee Jamieson, Antonin Artaud: From Theory to Practice, Greenwich Exchange, 2007

His greatest influence, however, was Joan Littlewood. Brook described her as "the most galvanising director in mid-20th century Britain". Brook's work was also inspired by the theories of experimental theatre of Jerzy Grotowski, Bertolt Brecht, Chris Covics and Vsevolod Meyerhold and by the works of G. I. Gurdjieff, Edward Gordon Craig, and Matila Ghyka.

Collaborators
Brook collaborated with actors Paul Scofield as Lear, John Gielgud in Measure for Measure, and Glenda Jackson; designers Georges Wakhévitch and Sally Jacobs; and writers Ted Hughes and William Golding. Brook first encountered Wakhévitch in London when he saw the production of Jean Cocteau's ballet Le Jeune Homme et la Mort which Wakhévitch designed. Brook declared that he "was convinced that this was the designer for whom I had been waiting".

International Centre for Theatre Research

In 1971, with Micheline Rozan, Brook founded the International Centre for Theatre Research, a multinational company of actors, dancers, musicians and others, which travelled widely in the Middle East and Africa in the early 1970s. It has been based in Paris at the Bouffes du Nord theatre since 1974. The troupe played at immigrant hostels, in villages and in refugee camps, sometimes for people who had never been exposed to theatre.

The Mahabharata

In the mid-1970s, Brook, with writer Jean-Claude Carrière, began work on adapting the Indian epic poem the Mahabharata into a stage play, which was first performed in 1985 and later developed into a televised mini series.

In a long article in 1985, The New York Times noted "overwhelming critical acclaim", and that the play "did nothing less than attempt to transform Hindu myth into universalized art, accessible to any culture". However, many post-colonial scholars have challenged the claim to universalism, accusing the play of orientalism. Gautam Dasgupta wrote that "Brook's Mahabharata falls short of the essential Indianness of the epic by staging predominantly its major incidents and failing to adequately emphasize its coterminous philosophical precepts."

In 2015, Brook returned to the world of The Mahabharata with a new Young Vic production, Battlefield, in collaboration with Jean-Claude Carrière and Marie-Hélène Estienne.

Tierno Bokar
In 2005, Brook directed Tierno Bokar, based on the life of the Malian sufi of the same name. The play was adapted for the stage by Marie-Hélène Estienne from a book by Amadou Hampâté Bâ (translated into English as A Spirit of Tolerance: The Inspiring Life of Tierno Bokar). The book and play detail Bokar's life and message of religious tolerance. Columbia University produced 44 related events, lectures, and workshops that were attended by over 3,200 people throughout the run of Tierno Bokar. Panel discussions focused on topics of religious tolerance and Muslim tradition in West Africa.

Personal life
In 1951, Brook married actress Natasha Parry. They had two children: Irina, an actress and director, and Simon, a director. Parry died of a stroke in July 2015, aged 84.

Brook died in Paris on 2 July 2022, aged 97.

Work
Sources for Brook's productions are held by the Academy of Arts in Berlin, the Princess of Asturias Foundation, and others.

Shakespeare 
Brook was fascinated with the works of Shakespeare which he produced in England and elsewhere, in films, and adaptation. In 1945, he began with King John, with designer Paul Shelving at the Birmingham Repertory Theatre. At the Shakespeare Memorial Theatre, he directed Measure for Measure in 1950 and The Winter's Tale in 1952, both with John Gielgud, followed there by Hamlet Prince of Denmark in 1955, with Paul Scofield (Hamlet), Alec Clunes (Claudius), Diana Wynyard (Gertrude), Mary Ure (Ophelia), Ernest Thesiger (Polonius), Richard Johnson (Laertes), Michael David (Horatio), and Richard Pasco (Fortinbras). Titus Andronicus, with Laurence Olivier and Vivien Leigh, was played there the same year, and also on a European tour in 1957.

Brooks's 1953 staging of King Lear, for the American TV show Omnibus, starred Orson Welles in Welles's first-ever television production.

His first work for the Royal Shakespeare Company was in 1962 King Lear, with Paul Scofield. He created a legendary version of A Midsummer Night's Dream, with designer Sally Jacobs (designer), John Kane (Puck), Frances de la Tour (Helena), Ben Kingsley (Demetrius) and Patrick Stewart (Snout) in 1970. He directed the film King Lear, again with Scofield, in 1971.

He kept producing works by Shakespeare for the Théâtre des Bouffes du Nord, in French, including Timon d'Athènes, adaptated by Jean-Claude Carrière, 1974, Mesure pour mesure in 1978 and as a film a year later, La Tempête, adaptated by Carrière, with Sotigui Kouyaté in 1990.

He directed The Tragedy of Hamlet, with Adrian Lester (Hamlet), Jeffery Kissoon (Claudius / Ghost), Natasha Parry (Gertrude), Shantala Shivalingappa (Ophelia), Bruce Myers (Polonius), Rohan Siva (Laertes / Guildenstern), Scott Handy (Horatio) and Yoshi Oida (Player King / Rosencrantz) in 2000, followed by a TV film version in 2002. In 2009, he directed a theatrical version of sonnets, Love is my Sin. In 2010, Shakespeare was among the authors for the production Warum warum (Why Why), written by Brook and Marie-Hélène Estienne after also Antonin Artaud, Edward Gordon Craig, Charles Dullin, Vsevolod Meyerhold and Motokiyo Zeami.

Works with RSC
 1946: Love's Labour's Lost (Shakespeare Memorial Theatre)
 1947: Romeo and Juliet (Shakespeare Memorial Theatre)
 1950: Measure for Measure, with John Gielgud (Shakespeare Memorial Theatre)
 1952: The Winter's Tale, with John Gielgud (Shakespeare Memorial Theatre)
 1955: Titus Andronicus, with Laurence Olivier and Vivien Leigh (Shakespeare Memorial Theatre)
 1957: The Tempest, with John Gielgud (Shakespeare Memorial Theatre)
 1962: King Lear with Paul Scofield
 1964: Marat/Sade
 1966: US, an anti-Vietnam War protest play with The Royal Shakespeare Company, documented in the film Benefit of the Doubt
 1970: A Midsummer Night's Dream, with John Kane (Puck), Frances de la Tour (Helena), Ben Kingsley (Demetrius) and Patrick Stewart (Snout)
 1978: Antony and Cleopatra, with Glenda Jackson, Alan Howard, Jonathan Pryce, Alan Rickman, Juliet Stevenson, Patrick Stewart and David Suchet

Other major productions
 1951: A Penny for a Song, by John Whiting
 1955: Hamlet, with Paul Scofield
 1956: A View from the Bridge, by Arthur Miller
 1958: The Visit, with Alfred Lunt and Lynn Fontanne
 1964: Marat/Sade, by Peter Weiss
 1968: Oedipus with John Gielgud and Irene Worth, adapted by Ted Hughes, National Theatre
 1971: Orghast, by Ted Hughes
 1974: Timon d'Athènes, adaptation by Jean-Claude Carrière, Théâtre des Bouffes du Nord
 1975: Les Iks, by Colin Turnbull, adaptation Jean-Claude Carrière, Théâtre des Bouffes
 1977: Ubu aux Bouffes, after Alfred Jarry, Théâtre des Bouffes
 1978: Mesure pour mesure, by William Shakespeare, Théâtre des Bouffes
 1979: La Conférence des oiseaux (The Conference of the Birds), after Farid al-Din Attar, Festival d'Avignon; Théâtre des Bouffes
 1979: L'Os de Mor Lam, by Birago Diop, Théâtre des Bouffes
 1981: La Tragédie de Carmen, after Prosper Mérimée, Henri Meilhac and Ludovic Halévy, Viviane Beaumont Theater, Lincoln Center, New York City
 1981: La Cerisaie, by Anton Chekhov, Théâtre des Bouffes
 1984: Tchin-Tchin, by François Billetdoux, directed with Maurice Bénichou, with Marcello Mastroianni, Théâtre Montparnasse
 1985: Le Mahabharata (The Mahabharata), Festival d'Avignon
 1988: The Cherry Orchard by Anton Chekhov, Majestic Theatre, Brooklyn
 1989: Woza Albert!, by Percy Mtawa, Mbongeni Ngema and Barney Simon
 1990: La Tempête, by William Shakespeare, adaptation by Jean-Claude Carrière, with Sotigui Kouyaté, Théâtre des Bouffes
 1992: Impressions de Pelléas, after Claude Debussy, Théâtre des Bouffes
 1993: L'Homme Qui, after The Man Who Mistook His Wife for a Hat by Oliver Sacks
 1995: Qui est là, after texts by Antonin Artaud, Bertolt Brecht, Edward Gordon Craig, Vsevolod Meyerhold, Konstantin Stanislavski and Motokiyo Zeami
 1995: Oh les beaux jours, by Samuel Beckett
 1998: Je suis un phénomène, after prodigieuse mémoire by Alexander Luria
 1998: Don Giovanni by Mozart, for the 50th Festival International d'Art Lyrique d'Aix-en-Provence
 1999: Le Costume, by Can Themba
 2000: Hamlet by William Shakespeare, with Adrian Lester
 2002: Far Away, by Caryl Churchill
 2002: La Mort de Krishna, extract from Mahabharata de Vyasa, adaptation by Jean-Claude Carrière and Marie-Hélène Estienne
 2003: Ta main dans la mienne, by Carol Rocamora
 2004: Tierno Bokar, after Vie et enseignement de Tierno Bokar-Le sage de Bandiagara by Amadou Hampâté Bâ, with Sotigui Kouyaté
 2004: Le Grand Inquisiteur, after The Brothers Karamazov by Dostoyevsky
 2006: Sizwe Banzi est mort, by Athol Fugard, John Kani and Winston Ntshona, Festival d'Avignon
 2008: Fragments, after Samuel Beckett
 2009: Love is my sin, sonnets by William Shakespeare
 2009: 11 and 12, after Vie et enseignement de Tierno Bokar-Le Sage de Bandiagara by Amadou Hampâté Bâ
 2010: Warum warum, by Peter Brook and Marie-Hélène Estienne after Antonin Artaud, Edward Gordon Craig, Charles Dullin, Vsevolod Meyerhold, Motokiyo Zeami and William Shakespeare
 2011: A Magic Flute, an adaptation of Mozart's The Magic Flute, directed with Marie-Hélène Estienne, composer Franck Krawczyk to positive reviews at the Gerald W. Lynch Theater of John Jay College.
 2013: The Suit, after Can Themba's tale, directed with Marie-Hélène Estienne and Franck Krawczyk
 2015: Battlefield, from The Mahabharata and Jean-Claude Carrière's play, adapted and directed by Peter Brook and Marie-Hélène Estienne
 2018: The Prisoner, written and directed by Peter Brook and Marie-Hélène Estienne
 2019:  'Why?' . Written and directed by Peter Brook and Marie-Hélène Estienne

Filmography
 1953: The Beggar's Opera
 1960: Moderato Cantabile (UK title Seven Days... Seven Nights) with Jeanne Moreau and Jean-Paul Belmondo
 1963: Lord of the Flies
 1967: Ride of the Valkyrie
 1967: Marat/Sade
 1968: Tell Me Lies
 1971: King Lear
 1979: Meetings with Remarkable Men
 1979: Mesure pour mesure
 1982: La Cerisaie
 1983: La Tragédie de Carmen
 1989: The Mahabharata
 2002: The Tragedy of Hamlet (TV)
 2012: The Tightrope (documentary film, co-written and directed by Simon Brook)

Awards
 Tony Award for Best Direction of a Play for Marat/Sade, 1966
 Tony Award for Best Direction of a Play for A Midsummer Night's Dream, 1971

 Brigadier Prize, 1975, for Timon of Athens
 Grand Prix Dominique, 1981
 Laurence Olivier Award, 1983
 Emmy Award, 1984, for La tragédie de Carmen
 Prix Italia, 1984
 Europe Theatre Prize, 1989
 International Emmy Award, 1990, for The Mahabharata
 Kyoto Prize in Arts and Philosophy, 1991
 Praemium Imperiale, 1997
 Dan David Prize, 2005
 The Ibsen Award for 2008, first winner of the prize of NOK 2.5 mill (approximately £200,000).
 Critics' Circle Award for Distinguished Service to the Arts 2008

Honours
 Commander of the Order of the British Empire, 1965
 Induction into the American Theater Hall of Fame, 1983
 Honorary DLitt, University of Birmingham, 1990
 Honorary Fellow of Magdalen College, Oxford, 1991
 Honorary DLitt, University of Strathclyde, 1990
 Honorary DLitt, University of Oxford, 1994
 Officier de l'Ordre de la Légion d'honneur (France), 1995
 Companion of Honour, 1998 (He previously declined a knighthood.)
 President's Medal by the British Academy, 2011
 Commandeur de la Légion d'honneur (France), 2013
 Princess of Asturias Award in Arts, 2019
 Padma Shri (India), 2021

Europe Theatre Prize 
In 1989 he was awarded the II Europe Theatre Prize in Taormina, with the following motivation:In the field of world theatre of the second half of our century, the long theoretical and practical work of Peter Brook has – without any doubt – unrivalled merits, which are – broadly speaking – unique. Brook's first merit is that of having always pursued an authentic research outside the sterile 'routine' of what he has defined as 'Deadly Theatre'. Brook's second merit is that of having been able to use different languages of contemporary scene; in the same way he has been able to unify the variety of languages. Brook's third merit is that of having discovered and given back a bright vitality to some great cultural and theatrical heritages which hitherto had remained distant from us both in space and time. Nevertheless – without any doubt – Brook's noblest and most constant merit is that of having never separated the strictness and finesse of research from the necessity that the result of those ones would have had the audience as their receiver and interlocutor; the audience which is also requested to renew its habits.

Published works

References

Further reading 

 Jamieson, Lee, Antonin Artaud: From Theory to Practice (Greenwich Exchange: London, 2007) Contains practical exercises on Artaud drawn from Brook's Theatre of Cruelty Season at the RSC; 
 Freeman, John, The Greatest Shows on Earth: World Theatre from Peter Brook to the Sydney Olympics. Libri: Oxford; 
 Heilpern, John, Conference of the Birds: The Story of Peter Brook in Africa, Faber, 1977; 
 Hunt, Albert and Geoffrey Reeves. Peter Brook (Directors in Perspective). Cambridge University Press. (1995)
 Kustow, Michael. Peter Brook: A Biography. Bloomsbury. (2005),  
 
 
 
 
 Zohar, Ouriel, Meetings with Peter Brook, Zohar, Tel-Aviv 176 pp. (1990) , .

Obituaries

External links

 

 Dan David Prize laureate 2005
 
 
 
 
 
 
 Peter Brook Experimental Theatre Organization
 Brook's Mahabharata (review) Caravan Magazine
 

1925 births
2022 deaths
20th-century British male writers
21st-century British male writers
Acting theorists
Alumni of Magdalen College, Oxford
British expatriates in France
British opera directors
British theatre directors
Brook family
Commanders of the Order of the British Empire
Emmy Award winners
English Jews
English people of Latvian-Jewish descent
English theatre directors
Film directors from London
Jewish film people
Jewish theatre directors
Kyoto laureates in Arts and Philosophy
Members of the Academy of Arts, Berlin
Members of the Order of the Companions of Honour
Officiers of the Légion d'honneur
Padma Shri Award
People from Chiswick
Prix Italia winners
Recipients of the Praemium Imperiale
Recipients of the President's Medal (British Academy)
Royal Shakespeare Company members
Theatre practitioners
Tony Award winners
Writers from London
Students of George Gurdjieff